Yuraq Q'asa (Quechua yuraq white, q'asa mountain pass, "white mountain pass", Hispanicized spelling Yuracjasa) is a mountain in the Andes of Peru, about  high. It lies in the Cusco Region, Canchis Province, Pitumarca District, and in the Quispicanchi Province, Cusipata District. Yuraq Q'asa is situated south of the mountain Ch'aqu, west of the mountain Chachakumayuq and north-east of the mountain Tiklla Q'asa.

References

Mountains of Peru
Mountains of Cusco Region